Blue Springs can refer to:

Blue Springs, Alabama
Blue Springs (Marion County, Florida)
Blue Springs, Mississippi
Blue Springs, Missouri
Blue Springs (Hot Spring), a hot spring in Mammoth Hot Springs, Yellowstone National Park
Blue Springs, Nebraska
Blue Springs-Wymore Township, Gage County, Nebraska
Blue Springs (Jackson County, Florida), a 1st magnitude spring in Jackson County, Florida
Battle of Blue Springs, a battle in the American Civil War
Gilchrist Blue Springs State Park, in Gilchrist County, Florida

See also
Blue Spring (disambiguation)